Wicklow Hall Plantation is a historic plantation complex located near Georgetown, Georgetown County, South Carolina. The complex includes the plantation house and several dependencies. The Wicklow Hall Plantation House is a two-story, Greek Revival style clapboard structure on a low brick foundation. The main portion of the structure was probably built between about 1831 and 1840 and enlarged by additions after 1912. Also on the property are a kitchen, corn crib, carriage house, a small house (believed to have been slave quarters), stable, privy, and a schoolhouse. Wicklow was a major rice plantation during the mid-1800s, and associated with the prominent Lowndes family of South Carolina.

It was listed on the National Register of Historic Places in 1978.

References

External links

Historic American Buildings Survey in South Carolina
Plantations in South Carolina
Houses on the National Register of Historic Places in South Carolina
Houses completed in 1840
Greek Revival houses in South Carolina
National Register of Historic Places in Georgetown County, South Carolina
Houses in Georgetown County, South Carolina
Slave cabins and quarters in the United States